The Falcon-class destroyers were a batch of three destroyers, built for the Royal Navy between 1899 and 1901 and serving in the First World War. The destroyers were sometimes referred to as the Falcon-class, after the lead ship of the batch HMS Falcon, however they were officially classified as part of the Gipsy-class.

Ships

See also
Gipsy-class destroyer

C-class destroyer (1913)

List of destroyer classes of the Royal Navy

References

Destroyers of the Royal Navy
Ship classes of the Royal Navy